Ceccoli is an Italian surname popular in San Marino. it was popularized by books such as Foucault's Pendulum.

Notable people
Notable people with this surname include:
 Alvin Ceccoli (born 1974) is an Australian-Sammarinese footballer
 Edda Ceccoli (born 1947), captain regent of San Marino 
 Michele Ceccoli (born 1973), Sammarinese footballer 
 Nicoletta Ceccoli, Italian Artist

Other
 Anthony Ceccoli, a character in Dollhouse, also known as Victor (Dollhouse)